The district of Guarda is located in the Centro Region of Portugal, except Vila Nova de Foz Côa, which is in the Norte Region. The district capital and most populous city is Guarda.

Municipalities
The district contains 14 municipalities:

 Aguiar da Beira
 Almeida
 Celorico da Beira 
 Figueira de Castelo Rodrigo 
 Fornos de Algodres 
 Gouveia 
 Guarda
 Manteigas 
 Mêda 
 Pinhel  
 Sabugal 
 Seia
 Trancoso 
 Vila Nova de Foz Côa

Cities
The following seat of municipalities have city (cidade)status:
Gouveia, Guarda, Meda, Pinhel, Sabugal, Trancoso.

Subregions Included within the District of Guarda
Beira Interior Norte, Serra da Estrela, Douro and Dão-Lafões.

Geography
The main mountain ranges are the Serra da Estrela and Serra da Marofa. The main rivers are the Mondego, Côa, and Douro.

Main Monuments/Castles
Guarda Sé/ Cathedral of Guarda.
Castles:(Castelos de) Pinhel, Sabugal, Sortelha, Marialva, Celorico, Rodrigo, Almeida, Trancoso.
Pelourinhos de Pinhel and Alverca da Beira.

Summary of votes and seats won 1976-2022

|- class="unsortable"
!rowspan=2|Parties!!%!!S!!%!!S!!%!!S!!%!!S!!%!!S!!%!!S!!%!!S!!%!!S!!%!!S!!%!!S!!%!!S!!%!!S!!%!!S!!%!!S!!%!!S!!%!!S
|- class="unsortable" align="center"
!colspan=2 | 1976
!colspan=2 | 1979
!colspan=2 | 1980
!colspan=2 | 1983
!colspan=2 | 1985
!colspan=2 | 1987
!colspan=2 | 1991
!colspan=2 | 1995
!colspan=2 | 1999
!colspan=2 | 2002
!colspan=2 | 2005
!colspan=2 | 2009
!colspan=2 | 2011
!colspan=2 | 2015
!colspan=2 | 2019
!colspan=2 | 2022
|-
| align="left"| PS || 25.2 || 2 || 26.3 || 1 ||26.3 || 1 || style="background:#FF66FF;"|33.5 || style="background:#FF66FF;"|2 || 23.3 || 2 || 21.8 || 1 || 26.8 || 1 || style="background:#FF66FF;"|43.7 || style="background:#FF66FF;"|2  || style="background:#FF66FF;"|43.4 || style="background:#FF66FF;"|2 || 34.7 || 2 || style="background:#FF66FF;"|46.8 || style="background:#FF66FF;"|2 || style="background:#FF66FF;"|36.0 || style="background:#FF66FF;"|2 || 28.3 || 1 || 33.8 || 2 || style="background:#FF66FF;"|37.6 || style="background:#FF66FF;"|2 || style="background:#FF66FF;"|45.1 || style="background:#FF66FF;"|2
|-
| align="left"| PSD || 25.7 || 2 || align=center colspan=4 rowspan=2|In AD || 31.5 || 2 || style="background:#FF9900;"|33.6 || style="background:#FF9900;"|2 || style="background:#FF9900;"|60.0 || style="background:#FF9900;"|4 || style="background:#FF9900;"|58.6 || style="background:#FF9900;"|3 || 39.9 || 2 || 39.2|| 2 || style="background:#FF9900;"|48.5 || style="background:#FF9900;"|2 || 34.7 || 2 || 35.6 || 2 ||  style="background:#FF9900;"|46.3 || style="background:#FF9900;"|3 || align=center colspan=2 rowspan=2|In PàF || 34.3 || 1 || 33.5 || 1
|-
| align="left"| CDS-PP || style="background:#0093DD;"|32.1 || style="background:#0093DD;"|2 || 23.8 || 1 || 19.5 || 1 || 6.6 ||  || 5.9 ||  || 9.9 ||  || 9.8 ||  || 9.6 ||  || 7.0 ||  || 11.2 ||  || 11.2 ||  || 5.0 ||  || 2.2 ||  
|-
| align="left"| AD || colspan=2| || style="background:#00FFFF;"|60.6 || style="background:#00FFFF;"|4 || style="background:#00FFFF;"|60.6 || style="background:#00FFFF;"|4 || colspan=26| 
|-
| align="left"| PàF || colspan=26| || style="background:#00AAAA;"|45.6 || style="background:#00AAAA;"|2 || colspan=4|
|-
! Total seats || colspan=2|6 || colspan=10|5 || colspan=16|4 || colspan=4|3
|-
! colspan=33|Source: Comissão Nacional de Eleições
|}

See also
 Barregão, a village located in the district of Guarda

 
Districts of Portugal